Leptoceratopsidae is an extinct family of neoceratopsian dinosaurs from Asia, North America and Europe. Leptoceratopsids resembled, and were closely related to, other neoceratopsians, such as the families Protoceratopsidae and Ceratopsidae, but they were more primitive and generally smaller.

Phylogeny 
Leptoceratopsidae was originally named by Franz Nopcsa von Felső-Szilvás in 1923 as a subfamily Leptoceratopsinae, and its type species is Leptoceratops gracilis. Mackovicky, in 2001, defined it as a stem-based taxon and a family consisting of Leptoceratops gracilis and all species closer to Leptoceratops than to Triceratops horridus. The cladogram below follows the topologies from a 2015 analysis by Yiming He, Peter J. Makovicky, Kebai Wang, Shuqing Chen, Corwin Sullivan, Fenglu Han, Xing XuMichael J. Ryan, David C. Evans, Philip J. Currie, Caleb M. Brown and Don Brinkman.

Palaeobiogeography

Definitive leptoceratopsids have so far been found exclusively in the Late Cretaceous period (late Santonian - late Maastrichtian stages) of Asia and Western North America; however, material referred to leptoceratopsids from the early Campanian of North Carolina and Sweden extends their geographic range into Eastern North America and Europe. A possible leptoceratopsid ulna, named Serendipaceratops, has been found in Victoria, Australia. However, a 2010 study showed that it could not be confidently referred to any ornithischian family, and is considered a nomen dubium.

Leptoceratopsids range in age from Gryphoceratops, of the late Santonian, to Leptoceratops, right at the end of the Cretaceous in the late Maastrichtian. Gryphoceratops is the first definitive record of Santonian leptoceratopsid. It was named based on a partial left dentary from Alberta, Canada. Gryphoceratops represents the oldest known leptoceratopsid and probably the smallest adult ceratopsian known from North America.

Leptoceratopsids are known from Eastern North America by a partial maxilla dated to the early Campanian of North Carolina, whilst the European material referred to Leptoceratopsidae consists of isolated teeth and vertebrae from the early Campanian of Sweden. The former represents the first known ceratopsian from Eastern North America, and its specialised maxillary anatomy supports the hypothesis that Appalachia was isolated from Western Europe and Laramidia for an extended period during the Late Cretaceous, resulting in an endemic Late Cretaceous fauna. The shared presence of leptoceratopsids in Appalachia and Western Europe has implications for their biogeographic dispersal, suggesting the possibility that leptoceratopsids entered Appalachia through either Western Europe or Laramidia; however, it is also possible that the European leptoceratopsids also represented a distinct endemic assemblage, as the Fennoscandian Shield was also an isolated landmass during the Late Cretaceous.

See also

 Timeline of ceratopsian research

References

 
Cretaceous dinosaurs
Dinosaurs of Asia
Dinosaurs of North America
Taxa named by Franz Nopcsa von Felső-Szilvás
Prehistoric dinosaur families